Kirralee Hayes (born 26 May 2004) is an Australian Paralympic swimmer. She represented Australia at the 2020 Tokyo Paralympics.

Swimming 
Hayes, a founding member of the Genesis Aquatics based at Genesis Christian College, qualified for the S13 (vision impaired) 50m Freestyle and 100m Butterfly at the 2020 Summer Paralympics.

At 2021 Australian Swimming Trials, she finished second in Women's 50m Freestyle S13.

At the 2020 Tokyo Paralympics, she swam in two events, the 50 m freestyle S11 and the 100 m butterfly S11 but did not qualify for the finals.

At the 2022 Commonwealth Games, Birmingham, England, she won the bronze medal in the Women's 50 m freestyle S13. 

Hayes is based at the Australian Institute of Sport in Canberra and coached by Yuriy Vdovychenko, but regularly returns to train at Genesis Aquatics with her coach Rick Pendleton.

References

External links

2004 births
Living people
Female Paralympic swimmers of Australia
Swimmers at the 2020 Summer Paralympics
Swimmers at the 2022 Commonwealth Games
Commonwealth Games medallists in swimming
Commonwealth Games bronze medallists for Australia
Visually impaired category Paralympic competitors
Australian female freestyle swimmers
Australian female butterfly swimmers
S13-classified Paralympic swimmers
21st-century Australian women
Medallists at the 2022 Commonwealth Games
Australian blind people